In the German military, Waffenfarbe (German: "branch-of-service colors" or "corps colors") is a visual method that the armed forces use to distinguish between different corps or troop functions in its armed services. The Waffenfarbe itself can take the form of the color of the collar patch, of the piping (embellishment) around the shoulder boards or shoulder marks, or—for enlisted ranks—of the piping around the collar and the garrison cap (Schiffchen). (In the latter places, NCOs wear cords of dark gold, officers silver, and generals gold.)

Present

Army
The Bundeswehr uses a Waffenfarben color scheme to indicate troop types; they appear on the collar patch and as piping around the shoulder boards or straps showing a soldier's rank.

Colored soldiers' berets are slightly less differentiated than the Waffenfarben; in fact, corps or troop function is indicated by a beret badge.

Heer (army)

Luftwaffe (air force)

The German Air Force uses a restricted color spectrum. While the air force normally uses golden yellow, officers "in the general staff service" (im Generalstabsdienst – there is no general staff as such in the Bundeswehr) wear wine-red, and generals bright red. The collar patches (Kragenspiegel) of generals and general staff service officers also differ from the normal air force design, as they are identical with the army ones.

Deutsche Marine (navy)
The German Navy uses various emblems above the rank stripes on the sleeves rather than function-specific colors to distinguish between corps. It traditionally did not use Waffenfarben.

History

Waffenfarben used by the Reichsheer (1921–1935)

Waffenfarben used by the Wehrmacht (1935–1945)

In the German Heer and Luftwaffe, there was a strictly defined systematic of Waffenfarben on collar patches, and as uniform piping around the shoulder boards or shoulder straps. The Waffenfarben of the Reichswehr (1921 until c. 1935) were almost identical to those of the Wehrmacht.

Waffenfarben used by the SS (1938–1945)

Waffenfarben worn by the National People's Army (1956–1990)

East German (DDR) Nationale Volksarmee uniforms initially wore the Waffenfarben as worn by the Wehrmacht. Between 1974 and 1979, along with the introduction of uniforms with open collar and tie, the patches of the ground force uniforms were unified with a dark gray base and a white filling, along with a white collar piping; the piping of the shoulder boards/shoulder straps remained the only part carrying a Waffenfarbe. However, air/air defense forces, paratroopers, and generals as well as the navy continued to wear their specially designed Waffenfarbe patches.

The uniform of the Border Troops was distinguished from that of the NVA ground force and Air Force/Air Defense Force by a green armband with large silver letters identifying the wearer's affiliation, and a green cap band.

Similarities in other armies
The use of Waffenfarbe to distinguish between troop functions was not unique to the Wehrmacht during World War II. After 1942, the Soviet Army, too,  used analogous shoulder boards to distinguish troop functions: ground forces general officers and infantry used crimson, cavalry used blue, artillery and tank troops used red, and the rest of the ground forces used black, while the air force and airborne troops used sky blue. Likewise the British Army utilized analogous strips of cloth on the sleeves to likewise identify troop functions.

Today, Waffenfarbe schemes are also used in Austria, Finland, Hungary, Italy, Japan, Poland, Romania, Somalia and Switzerland. For a full list of analogous troop function insignia currently in use of the US Army, see United States Army branch insignia.

See also
 Corps colours (Waffen-SS)
 Corps colours of the Sturmabteilung

References

 Glossary of German military terms
 Adolf Schlicht, John R. Angolia: Die deutsche Wehrmacht, Uniformierung und Ausrüstung 1933-1945Vol. 1: Das Heer, Motorbuch Verlag, Stuttgart 1992Vol. 3: Die Luftwaffe, Motorbuch Verlag, Stuttgart 1999(very detailed information and discussion, but not colorized)

External links
 German WWII Army & SS Rank & Insignia

German military uniforms
Military insignia
Color in culture